The 1973 Gent–Wevelgem was the 35th edition of the Gent–Wevelgem cycle race and was held on 3 April 1973. The race started in Ghent and finished in Wevelgem. The race was won by Eddy Merckx of the Molteni team.

General classification

References

Further reading
 

Gent–Wevelgem
1973 in road cycling
1973 in Belgian sport
April 1973 sports events in Europe